Alisea Airlines was a charter airline based in Italy, which was established in 1999 as Italfly. Flight operations only took place during a brief period between 2002 and 2003.

Fleet
Over the years, Alisea Airlines operated the following aircraft types:

See also
 List of defunct airlines of Italy

References

Italian companies disestablished in 2003
Defunct airlines of Italy
Airlines established in 1999
Airlines disestablished in 2003
Italian companies established in 1999